MacLaren (Mac) Thompson Cummings (born January 23, 1979) is an American entrepreneur and co-founder of Terakeet, a search engine optimization firm.

Education 
Cummings was raised in Tully, New York. He attended Manlius Pebble Hill High School in DeWitt, NY. After graduating from high school, Cummings attended Cornell University, where he received his Bachelor of Science degree from the School of Industrial and Labor Relations in 2001.

Career 
In 1998, Cummings launched Mindshark Software and Consulting from his Cornell University dorm room and served as CEO. Cummings led Mindshark to several software agreements with clients such as Forbes and General Electric.

Terakeet 
In 2001, Cummings co-founded Terakeet Corporation with business partner, Patrick Danial. Terakeet was founded as voice-recognition software for call centers. It received $600,000 from angel investors, but the company didn't turn a profit so it pivoted to search engine optimization in 2004. As CEO of Terakeet, Cummings has led the company through its growth into an enterprise SEO company that impacts multiple aspects of the client's websites, including backlinks and content strategies. The company also helps brands manage their online identity. By 2012 Cummings had expanded the Terakeet portfolio to include U.S. and international companies such as Coca-Cola, American Express and NBC Universal-Orlando. Terakeet has also worked with companies such as Chobani, Uber, and Dollar Shave Club.

In 2013, Cummings and Danial created Earned Visibility, Inc. and established Terakeet LLC as a subsidiary. Also in 2013, Cummings and Danial invested in Credit Card Insider, a  website that gives financial advice, and made the website part of Terakeet. Under Cummings, Terakeet grew from 75 employees in 2013 to 175 employees in 2015, earning Terakeet recognition as one of the fastest-growing companies in America, according to Inc. Magazine. In 2015, Cummings created a paid family leave policy for Terakeet after friends, family members and fellow employees experienced cancer diagnoses. The company has over 400 employees and estimated revenue of $100M as of 2022. Fortune Magazine named Terakeet one of the best places to work in 2017, 2020, 2021, and 2022.

Cummings ranked first in New York and ninth in the US on Glassdoor's 2021 Top CEOs for Small and Medium-Sized Businesses list. In 2022, Ernst & Young named Cummings the New York Entrepreneur of the Year.

Politics 
Cummings has been active in local and national politics and has been consulted for fundraising strategies on the technology and web side of campaigns.
Cummings served as Director of Internet Finance for Hillary Clinton’s presidential bid from February to June 2008.

Hillary Clinton's campaign chairman Terry McAuliffe sought Cummings out to work on the campaign, first as a consultant, then as part of the campaign team after Cummings organized a fundraiser in Syracuse, McAuliffe’s home town. After the Clinton campaign suspended in 2008, Cummings and Terakeet were selected to advise the Obama digital team on its content, blogging, and SEO strategies.  After the successful election of Barack Obama in 2008, Terakeet again was solicited to provide technology consulting to the campaign and its technical team. In 2013, Cummings advised then businessman and friend Terry McAuliffe on his run for Governor of Virginia. In 2016, Cummings and Terakeet were brought in during the last weeks of Hillary Clinton's presidential campaign, Hillary for America, to reach out to battleground states in a small role. In 2021, Cummings and his wife, Rochelle, hosted President Bill Clinton at their home in Skaneateles, NY.

References

1979 births
Living people
People from Tully, New York
Cornell University School of Industrial and Labor Relations alumni
People from Skaneateles, New York
Businesspeople from Syracuse, New York
Manlius Pebble Hill School alumni